René Dreyfus (6 May 1905 – 16 August 1993) was a French driver who raced automobiles for 14 years in the 1920s and 1930s, the Golden Era of Grand Prix motor racing.

Early life 
Dreyfus was born and raised in Nice to a Jewish family. He showed an early interest in automobiles, learning to drive before the age of nine. The middle of three children, his brother Maurice served as his business partner in his youth, and his manager in his racing career.

Career

Driving career 
Driving Maseratis, Ferraris, Delahayes, and Bugattis against some of the greatest drivers of all time, Dreyfus won 36 races across Europe, including Monaco, Florence, Rheims, Belgium, Cork, Dieppe, Pau, and at Tripoli in North Africa, becoming a French national hero.

He acquired a Bugatti and joined the Moto Club de Nice for younger competitive automotive enthusiasts. In 1924 he won his class in the first amateur race he entered, being the only entrant in the class, and went on to win three consecutive French Riviera championships in the next five years. In 1929 he entered his first professional race, the inaugural Grand Prix of Monaco, finishing first in his class and fifth overall.

The following year he won the race outright in a Bugatti, beating by 22 seconds the highly regarded Bugatti factory team, led by William Grover-Williams, winner of the previous year, and Louis Chiron. Realizing that factory cars were always faster than the cars owned by private entrants, Dreyfus reasoned that his only chance of winning lay in avoiding refueling stops, so he had additional fuel tanks added to his car with the intent of running the race without stop. This was not common practice at the time, since it was felt that fatigue would make it impossible, but Dreyfus' strategy proved correct.

The next few years saw Grand Prix racing become a metaphor for war, as the Nazi government of Germany chose this arena to prove their inherent superiority, nationalized the Mercedes-Benz and Auto Union racing teams, gave them seemingly unlimited money and ran them like a military campaign. This led to a remarkable era of competition. While many of the best European drivers of the era, for instance Chiron, were hired by the German teams and jumped at the chance to drive the most advanced cars available, as a Jew this option was not available to Dreyfus. Instead he, like the few other underdogs competing against the German teams, had to defend his nation's pride by dint of heroic skill and daring in inferior machinery. Although France had been the birthplace of automobile racing, it now was a distant third in the racing hierarchy, behind the all-consuming German onslaught and the perennially victorious Italians.

Escaping Nazi-occupied France, Dreyfus traveled to the United States to compete in the 1940 Indianapolis 500 alongside fellow Frenchman René Le Bègue. Driving a pair of Maseratis for the American/French owner Lucy O'Reilly Schell, Le Bègue qualified 31st, but Dreyfus was bumped and ended up as the second alternate. On race day, it was decided for the two drivers to split time in the car, and each drove two stints of approximately 50 laps (125 miles) apiece. Le Bègue started the race and ran approximately laps 1–50 and laps 101–150. Dreyfus piloted the car for laps 51–100 and from 151 to the finish. The pair brought the car home in 10th place, flagged 8 laps down. A rainstorm prompted officials to flag the race after only the first three finishers received the checkered flag.

Late life 
Dreyfus continued to race sporadically, including the 1952 24 Hours of Le Mans. His last race was the 12 Hours of Sebring in 1955, when Stanley "Wacky" Arnolt asked Dreyfus to captain the Arnolt-Bristol Racing Team. Dreyfus led the team to the Sebring Team Trophy and 1–2–3 in class. In 1980 he was invited back to the Monaco Grand Prix to celebrate the 50th anniversary of his victory. At age 75, he personally drove throughout Europe touring all the sites of his racing career, receiving public celebration and honors at each stop. At the banquet following the race, he was brought to the stage to sit once again in the Bugatti in which he had won, half a century earlier. He was also Grand Marshal of the 1980 United States Grand Prix at Watkins Glen.

Government service 
In an effort to induce manufacturers to develop new cars which would be competitive with the Germans, in 1937 the French government announced the 'Prix du Million', or the Million Franc Race. The prize money was a million francs, and in order to ensure that the competition tested each car's ultimate limits rather than just the driver's skill in passing other drivers, the race was a time trial against the clock at the treacherous Autodrome de Montlhéry track, which had taken the life of the great Antonio Ascari. Driving a Delahaye 145 for the Écurie Bleue team of Lucy O'Reilly Schell in testing and in the competition itself, Dreyfus risked death with a literally blistering pace, wearing the special Dunlop tires down to the fabric but handily overwhelming all competitors except the Bugatti team. On the last day of the competition he again went out on the track versus the Bugatti and again set an incredible pace, until he forced the Bugatti to the breaking point, winning the prize for Delahaye. In 1938 Dreyfus drove a Delahaye at Pau, a tight circuit running through village streets, beating the legendary Rudolf Caracciola and his Mercedes-Benz Silver Arrow, and becoming a national hero in France.

When World War II broke out, Dreyfus joined the French Army, where he served as a truck driver. In 1940, however, he was abruptly sent by the French government to the United States to represent France by driving a Maserati in the Indianapolis 500. Although the previous year's race had been won by a Maserati driven by American Wilbur Shaw, neither Dreyfus nor his team partner René Le Bègue was familiar with the mechanical requirements and the very different rules of racing at Indianapolis; this problem was exacerbated by both drivers not knowing English, and by the American racing community's reluctance to see a European win the "Great American Race." Despite suffering numerous substantial setbacks and penalties for not understanding the details of the rules, beginning with their attempts to qualify their two cars, Dreyfus and Le Bègue succeeded in co-driving the one car which they did qualify from the back of the grid to tenth place. Shaw again won the race in another Maserati.

In the meantime, the Germans had overrun Paris, and as a Jew who had famously humiliated the German racing effort, Dreyfus was advised by the French government not to return to occupied France. Instead he settled in New York City, where he opened a French restaurant, "Le Gourmet." Upon the United States entering the war, in 1942 Dreyfus enlisted in the United States Army and served in Europe as an interrogator in the Italian Campaign. After the war, in 1945 he became an American citizen and brought his brother Maurice back to New York, where they opened another French restaurant, "Le Chanteclair." This soon became the semi-official New York meeting spot for the world's automobile racing community, the rivalries of the past having been overcome by the spirit of fraternity. It continues today as the Madison Avenue Sports Car Driving and Chowder Society, officially founded in March 1957 and which meets monthly at Sardi's in NYC.

Major victories 
Belgian Grand Prix: 1934
Cork Grand Prix (Cork International Road Race): 1938

Grand Prix de Brignoles: 1931
Grand Prix de Dieppe: 1929, 1935
Circuit d'Esterel Plage 1930
Grand Prix de la Marne: 1930, 1935
Pau Grand Prix: 1938

Monaco Grand Prix: 1930

Racing record

Complete European Championship results 
(key) (Races in bold indicate pole position) (Races in italics indicate fastest lap)

Complete 24 Hours of Le Mans results

References

Further reading

External links 

Grand Prix History , Rene Dreyfus
New York Times obituary

1905 births
1993 deaths
Sportspeople from Nice
French emigrants to the United States
French racing drivers
20th-century French Jews
Grand Prix drivers
United States Army personnel of World War II
24 Hours of Le Mans drivers
European Championship drivers
French Army personnel of World War II
French Army soldiers